The Fiat 1800 and 2100 are six-cylinder automobiles produced by Italian manufacturer Fiat between 1959 and 1968.  Both models were introduced in 1959. A four-cylinder 1500 cc version, the 1500L, was added to the range in 1963. The 1800/2100 were designed by Fiat's own Dante Giacosa.

Fiat 1800 (1959-68)

The Fiat 1800 was introduced in 1959, offered as a 4-door sedan and a 5-door Familiare (Station Wagon). The 1800 model had a 6-cylinder in-line engine with 1795 cc and a power output of 75 hp (55 kW) delivered through a 4-speed transmission. Its maximum speed was, depending on the version, 
 - .

Fiat 2100 (1959-61)

The 2100 was a version with a bigger 2054 cc six-cylinder engine. In autumn 1959, the 2100 Speciale was introduced with a lengthened wheelbase and different front grille. The Speciale was used by diplomats. The 2100 was discontinued in Italy during 1961, when the Fiat 2300 became available.

Fiat 1500L (1963-68)

In 1963 Fiat used the body of Fiat 1800/2100 to create a new, less expensive model, the Fiat 1500L. To distinguish it from the 1300/1500 it used the designation 1500L (for 'Lunga, "long"). A reduced-performance version was also offered, aimed at taxi drivers. This proved popular in southern Europe, equipped with a version of the 1481 cc petrol inline-four engine developing just 60 bhp: the low power engine permitted the transport of customers in comfort and space at urban speeds, without consuming too much fuel.

This version was made also by SEAT in Spain, where no other petrol version of the Fiat 1800/2100 was ever produced. It was badged simply as SEAT 1500, since no equivalent of the Fiat 1500 was produced by SEAT. Nearly 200,000 Seat 1500s were built until 1972.

It is estimated that total production in Italy of the Fiat 1800/2100 range is 150,000.

Engines

References

Fiat Personenwagen, by Fred Steiningen, 1994. 

2100
1960s cars
Cars introduced in 1959
Rear-wheel-drive vehicles
Sedans
Station wagons